Witton Park is a village in County Durham, in England. It is situated to the west of Bishop Auckland. In 2001 it had a population of 384.

Famous people born in Witton Park 
 Brigadier General Roland Boys Bradford VC—youngest ever Brigadier General in the British Army at 25 (see the Bradford Brothers website for more information)
 Hebrew scholar Thomas Witton Davies raised and educated in Witton Park
Henry Bolckow, the German partner of Bolckow Vaughan became a Member of Parliament as did Witton Park (and later Bishop Auckland) tradesman Ben Spoor.
 Frederick Lewis, 1st Baron Essendon World shipping magnate was born and lived in Dents Villas.

References

External links
 A detailed study of the impact on the village of the 'Schedule D' status conferred on Witton Park by the 1951 Durham County Plan, which banned new development and enforced housing demolition, a 1979 MA thesis by R Snowdon: http://etheses.dur.ac.uk/10107/1/10107_6901.PDF?UkUDh:CyT
 

 
Villages in County Durham